Ope IF is a Swedish football club located in Ope near Östersund in Jämtland.

Background
Ope Idrottsförening is a sports club near Östersund that was founded on 30 January 1922. Football is the main activity today but in the past the club has also specialised in Nordic skiing, bandy and gymnastics. The bandy department was made its own club in 1974, called Östersunds BS.

Since their foundation Ope IF has participated mainly in the upper and middle divisions of the Swedish football league system.  The club's heyday was in the 1970s and the first half of the 1980s when they played in Division 2, which at that time was the second tier of Swedish football. In 1993 the club played one season in Division 1, which also represented second-tier football at that time.

In 1996/1997 the Ope IF, IFK Östersund, Ostersund / Torvalla FF clubs decided to work together on a joint venture to establish an elite new football club named Östersunds FK. Ope IF gave their place in the league Div 2 Norrland to Östersunds FK. Ostersund / Torvalla FF withdrew from the league in Division 4 and transferred their place to Ope IF. On occasions Ope IF has since played up to Division 3 in the same section as IFK Östersund.

In 2010 the Ope IF played in Division 3 Mellersta Norrland which is the fifth tier of Swedish football. They finished in a relegation position and therefore in 2011 will participate in Division 4. They play their home matches at the Torvallens IP to the south of Östersund, near the village of Ope. Matches have also been played at the Jämtkraft Arena in Östersund.

Ope IF are affiliated to the Jämtland-Härjedalens FF.

Season to season

Attendances

In recent seasons Ope IF have had the following average attendances:

In 1972 Ope played Manchester City in a friendly at Hofvallen in front of 5,500 spectators. In 2010 there were 679 spectators at the derby match with IFK Östersund.

Footnotes

External links
 Ope IF – Official club website
 Ope IF – Football club website

Sport in Östersund
Football clubs in Jämtland County
Association football clubs established in 1922
Bandy clubs established in 1922
Defunct bandy clubs in Sweden
1922 establishments in Sweden